Cintractia is a genus of fungi belonging to the family Cintractiaceae. It was first described by Marie Maxime Cornu in 1883.

The genus has cosmopolitan distribution.

A few species:

Cintractia albida 
Cintractia amazonica 
Cintractia amicta

References

External links
Cintractia occurrence data and images from GBIF

Ustilaginomycotina
Basidiomycota genera